Eddy Terrace (1935 - 2013) was a Belgian basketball player, who spent most of his career with Royale Union Saint Gilloise. One of the best Belgian players of his generation, he led all scorers at EuroBasket 1957, averaging 24.4 points a game on Belgium's way to a 12th position. His 63 points outburst against Albania in the same tournament is an all-time EuroBasket record.

External links
Fiba.com Profile
Fibaeurope.com Profile'
Rtbf.be Article

1935 births
Belgium national basketball players
2013 deaths
Guards (basketball)